The 2016–17 Northern Illinois Huskies women's basketball team represented Northern Illinois University during the 2016–17 NCAA Division I women's basketball season. The Huskies, led by second-year head coach Lisa Carlsen, played their home games at the Convocation Center in DeKalb, Illinois as members of the West Division of the Mid-American Conference. They finished the season 21–12, 12–6 in MAC play to finish in a tie for third place in the West division. They defeated Ohio and Western Michigan in the MAC tournament before losing to Toledo in the championship. They received an at-large bid to the WNIT where they lost in the first round to South Dakota State.

Previous season 
The Huskies finished the 2015–16 season 11–19, 4–14 in MAC play to finished in last place in the West division. They lost to Western Michigan in the first round of the MAC tournament.

Schedule and results

|-
!colspan=9 style="background:#; color:#;"| Exhibition

|-
!colspan=9 style="background:#; color:#;"| Non-conference regular season

|-
!colspan=9 style="background:#; color:#;"| MAC regular season

|-
!colspan=9 style="background:#"| MAC Tournament

|-
!colspan=9 style="background:#"| WNIT

See also
 2016–17 Northern Illinois Huskies men's basketball team

References

Northern Illinois
Northern Illinois Huskies women's basketball seasons
2017 Women's National Invitation Tournament participants